The Vloman Kill is an  tributary to the Hudson River in Albany County, New York, in the United States. Its source is in the town of New Scotland near the village of Voorheesville, and its mouth is at the Hudson River near the hamlet of Cedar Hill, in the town of Bethlehem.

Tributaries
 Phillipin Kill
 Dowers Kill

See also
List of rivers of New York

References

Rivers of Albany County, New York
Rivers of New York (state)
Tributaries of the Hudson River